The Gaelcholáiste Dhoire is a multi-denominational, 11–19, all-ability, coeducational, Irish-medium, post-primary school in Dungiven, County Londonderry, Northern Ireland. It is located inside Dungiven Castle.
it has had many sporting achievements most recently being the year 10 winning the ulster championship from a master class from The lads. Gaelcholáiste Dhoire is progressively getting larger and larger by the year, the school has just built a new, modern-styled building, which includes various new classrooms in which the students can learn easier. A large portion of Gaelcholáiste Dhoire's buildings are Portable buildings which can be removed with ease.

History
The college was established in 2015. It is the second Irish medium post-primary school to be established in Northern Ireland. In Early 2012, long before launch of Gaelcholáiste Dhoire in Dungiven, Diarmaid Ua Bruadair (Principal of Gaelcholáiste Dhoire) and his colleagues, tried to acquire the land in which the now ceased to exist, Maghera High School was located, Maghera High School closed on the 3rd February 2009 at 5:00pm. According to local knowledge, if the school were to launch in the location of Maghera High School, the school's name would be "Coláiste Ghleann Sheáin" (English: Glenshane College). The reason for the school not opening in Maghera is believed that the Protestant landowners did not want an Irish-language school to be opened on its ground. The Protestant landowners of Maghera High School went to the extent of bulldozing the school building(s) down so that there would be no chance of an Irish-language school opening on their ground. The reason for the closure of Maghera High School is believed that there were not enough Protestant students in the area to attend the school, as the Protestant population of Maghera and surrounding towns declined.

Academics
The college offers instruction in a total of 16 subjects that meet the revised Northern Ireland Curriculum requirements at Key Stage 3: English, Irish, Mathematics, Science, History, Religion, French, ICT, Technology and Design, Home Economics, Physical Education, Art, Music, Drama and Learning for Life and Work. English is taught through the medium of English, and the 15 other subjects are delivered through the medium of Irish (the target language) in line with best practice.

The college was praised for its leadership and pupil achievements by the inspectors from the Education and Training Inspectorate.

References

Educational institutions established in 2015
Secondary schools in County Londonderry
2015 establishments in Northern Ireland
Irish-language schools and college
Dungiven